Chrobrów  is a village in the administrative district of Gmina Żagań, within Żagań County, Lubusz Voivodeship, in western Poland.

See also
 Territorial changes of Poland after World War II

References

Villages in Żagań County